{{Infobox rugby team
  | teamname       = Penryn RFC
  | image          = 
  | imagesize      =
  | union          = Cornwall RFU
  | fullname       = Penryn Rugby Football Club
  | nickname       = The Borough
  | shortname      = 
  | countryflag    = ENG
  | countryflagvar = 
  | founded        = 
  | region         = 
  | ground         = Memorial Ground, 
  | location       = Penryn, Cornwall, England
  | capacity       = 4,000 (200 seats)
  | chairman       = Matthew Gray 
  | president      = Tim Nicholls 
  | captain        = Andrew Seviour
  | top scorer     = 
  | caps           =
  | coaches        = Marek Churcher (Director of Rugby) 
  | url            = http://www.penrynrugby.com/ 
  | league         =   | season         = 2022-23
  | position       = 7th
  | pattern_la1=_redhoops|pattern_b1=_redblackhoops_2|pattern_ra1=_redhoops|leftarm1=000000|body1=000000|rightarm1=000000|shorts1=000000|socks1=000000|
}}
Penyrn RFC is a Cornish rugby union club based in the town of Penryn, and is the oldest club side in the county having been formed in 1872.  The club currently has 2 senior men's teams (the seconds are known as the Saracens) as well as a ladies team, colts, and multiple mini/youth sides (male and female).  Nicknamed "The Borough" the club's colours are black and red.  The men's first team play in [[Counties 1 Tribute
Western West - a league at level 7 of the English rugby union system - having been promoted from Cornwall/Devon as champions at the end of the 2018–19 season.  They enjoy a rivalry with neighbours, Falmouth RFC.

History

Cornish dominance
Formed in 1872, Penryn are the oldest club side in Cornwall. The 1960s and 1970s were the glory days for the club as they dominated domestic rugby. This period of dominance began during the 1964–65 season when the club claimed a hat-trick of titles including the South West Merit Table, the Cornwall Knock-out Cup and the Cornwall Sevens Cup.  In 1968 they claimed the inaugural Cornwall Cup when they defeated Redruth 5–0 at the Recreation Ground in nearby Falmouth. Between 1968 and 1975, Penryn appeared in six finals, winning the cup five times which included sharing the 1970 cup after a 7–7 draw with St Ives (who also enjoyed great success during the early years of the cup).  The glory days would not last forever and the 1975 final victory over Penzance & Newlyn would be the club's fifth and last Cornwall Cup title, as they began to be overtaken by other clubs in the region such as Redruth and Camborne.

League rugby
The advent of the Courage leagues in 1987–88 saw Penryn placed in Courage Cornwall/Devon, a regional league ranked at tier 8 of the new league system. Penryn started league rugby well, winning successive league titles in 1989 and 1990 and gaining promotion to South West 2. In 1992 the club gained a third promotion in five seasons when they went up to South West Division 1 – which at tier 5 is the highest league ranking the club have achieved in its history. Early success in the league was counteracted with relegation in 1993 after just one season in South West Division 1. The club would stabilize in South West 2 for the rest of the 1990s but as they moved into the millennium they were relegated to Western Counties West in 2001. Two years later Penryn had one of their best seasons of recent memory as they won all 22 league games in Western Counties West on the way to claiming the title and promotion, scoring over 1,000 points in the process. The club retained momentum the following season as they finished second in South West 2 West, qualifying for a promotion play-off which they won 23–19, away to South West 2 East runner-up Swanage and Wareham.

The 2005–06 season saw Penryn in South West Division 1 which at tier 5 was the highest league ranking they had achieved since 1993. Although Penryn were competitive in the division, taking place in a furious relegation battle, they ended up going down on points difference (for/against) in 10th place, despite being tied on league points with relegation rivals, Clevedon and Oxford Harlequins. As is sometimes the case with a relegated team, Penryn struggled the following season and went down for the second year running, after a poor league campaign that saw only 2 wins. The slump was halted in 2009 when Penryn won the Tribute Cornwall/Devon title, following up with a second promotion in 2011 when they won Tribute Western Counties West.  Life in Tribute South West 1 West was short lived, however, and Penryn were relegated at the end of the 2011-12 season. The 2015–16 season was a disappointing one for the club as they were relegated from Tribute Western Counties West, falling back down to Tribute Cornwall/Devon. They did have a chance of silverware at the end of the season but lost heavily to a very strong Camborne in the final of the Cornwall Cup held at Tregorrick Park in St Austell. The club finished their first season back in Cornwall/Devon League in fifth place at the end of the 2016/17 season after relegation from Western Counties West.

At the end of the 2018-19 season Penryn were promoted as champions of Cornwall/Devon back into Western Counties West.

Season summary

Honours
 South West Merit Table champions: 1965
 Cornwall Knock-out Cup winners: 1965
 Cornwall Sevens Cup winners: 1965
 Cornwall Cup winners (5): 1968, 1970 (shared), 1972, 1973, 1975
 South-west promotion play-off (east v west) winners: 2003–04 
 Tribute Cornwall/Devon champions (3): 1988–89, 2008–09, 2018–19
 Tribute Western Counties West champions (3): 1989–90, 2002–03, 2010–11

Notable former players
  Roger Hosen – born in Mabe he started career with Penryn before going to play for a number of clubs including Northampton Saints, gaining 10 caps for England. As well as playing rugby union he was also a keen cricketer, representing Cornwall.   
  Ken Plummer – Penryn born winger who played for the club as well as Bristol and Welsh side Newport.  Went on to gain 4 caps for England. 
  Vic Roberts – played part of his career with Penryn. Gained 16 caps for England as well as being selected for the British and Irish Lions tour of 1950.
  Adryan Winnan – Penryn born full-back who started his career with the club. Went on to play Premiership rugby for Saracens as well as appearing for the Cornish Pirates late in his career.  
  Tom Voyce – Truro born player whose position was full-back or wing and who started his career with the minis at Penryn. Went on to play in the Premiership with the likes of Bath and Wasps as well as gaining 9 caps for England.
  Hugh Vyvyan – spent a season with Penryn in the 90s. Went on to forge a Premiership Premiership career playing at lock for Newcastle Falcons and Saracens, which included a solitary international cap for England.

Notes

See also

 Rugby union in Cornwall

References

External links
 Penryn RFC
 Cornwall RFU

Cornish rugby union teams
English rugby union teams
Rugby clubs established in 1872
Sports clubs in Cornwall
1872 establishments in England
Penryn, Cornwall